Charlotte von Kathen (1777–1850), was a German salonist who wrote historically important descriptions of contemporary literary personalities who frequented her salon.

Notes

19th-century German writers
1777 births
1850 deaths
Writers from Berlin
German salon-holders